Francesco Croce (1696–1773) was an Italian baroque architect. He was mainly active in Milan, where he worked for the Veneranda Fabbrica del Duomo di Milano.  Among other things, he designed the highest spire of the Duomo, the guglia del tiburio ("lantern spire"), on top of which the Madonnina statue is currently placed.

Notable works

Prominent works of Francesco Croce include:
 Guglia del Tiburio ("lantern spire") of the Duomo in Milan
 Portico of the Rotonda della Besana in Milan
 Palazzo Brentano in Corbetta
 Palazzo Clerici in Niguarda, Milan
 Palazzo Sormani in Milan
 Palazzo Bellisomi Vistarino in Pavia
 Church of Saint Peter in Abbiategrasso
He is also responsible for a major restoration of the Duomo di Lodi, and for the renewal of the historic Palazzo della Ragione in Milan, with the addition of a new upper floor with large round windows
 Villa Massari in Corbetta
 Villa Pertusati, Comazzo

References

18th-century Italian architects
Architects from Milan
Italian Baroque architects